Lady Margaret Erskine (8 October 1515 – 5 May 1572) was a mistress of King James V of Scotland and mother of Regent Moray.

She was a daughter of John Erskine, 5th Lord Erskine and Lady Margaret Campbell.

Royal mistress and mother
James V had a number of mistresses in his time, but some accounts describe her as his favourite. In 1527, Margaret Erskine married Robert Douglas of Lochleven, who was killed at the Battle of Pinkie Cleugh. She became the châtelaine of Lochleven Castle. She had two sons with James V after her marriage to Robert Douglas.  The first son, James Stewart, 1st Earl of Moray, was Regent during the minority of James VI. It was said that while Margaret Erskine was pregnant she had a prophetic dream of a lion and dragon, heraldic beasts, fighting in her womb.  The second son was Robert Stewart, who became Prior of Whithorn, and died in 1581.

Rumoured as royal bride
Although Margaret Erskine had married Robert Douglas there is evidence that James V considered arranging their divorce and marrying his mistress. It seems that James V or one of his advisors sought the advice of the Pope in the matter in June 1536. Shortly before James V finalised his marriage contract with Madeleine of Valois in November 1536, Charles, Bishop of Macon and French ambassador at the Vatican, wrote discussing his audience with the Pope. The Bishop had told the Pope that James never intended to marry Margaret and the petition was an imposture. The Pope replied that he had postponed any grant, thinking that the proposal was made without the King's knowledge.

Chronicle accounts and English letters also mention this scheme and the involvement of James Hamilton of Finnart. One of the English ambassador Sir William Howard's informants was Margaret Tudor, and he reported to Henry VIII; "Sire, I hear, both by the Queen's Grace your sister and diverse others that the marriage is broken between the King's Grace your nephew and the Monsieur de Vendôme, and he will marry a gentlewoman in Scotland, the Lord of Erskine's daughter, who was with your Grace the last summer at Thornbury; by whom he has had a child, having a husband, and his Grace has found means to divorce them. And there is great lamentation made for it in this country as far as men dare. Sire, there was no man made privy to this matter but Sir James Hamilton." (25 April 1536) Had the marriage gone ahead, their son James Stewart, the future Regent, could have been declared legitimate. By July 1536, the Imperial ambassador in London, Eustace Chapuys, and Spanish diplomats at the Vatican believed the marriage had already taken place.

Later years
In February 1558 Margaret Erskine joined with James MacGill of Nether Rankelour and James Adamson and James Barroun, two Edinburgh merchants, to borrow money and letters of finance from the Italian banker Timothy Cagnioli. The loan was to finance the journey of her son James Stewart to Paris, to finalise the marriage of Mary, Queen of Scots and Francis II of France.

Her son Robert Douglas was sent to England and Cambridge University in 1560 as a hostage for the Treaty of Berwick.

In July 1564 she resigned the lands of Nether Friarton in Fife so her son the Earl of Moray could give them to William Kirkcaldy of Grange and his wife Elizabeth Learmonth, replacing a charter of 1560.

She became the keeper of Mary, Queen of Scots at Lochleven castle in 1567, with her eldest son William Douglas, later Earl of Morton.

In the 1570s Margaret Erskine looked after her granddaughters at the New House of Lochleven and kept up a correspondence with their mother, Agnes Keith, Countess of Moray. Agnes Keith sent her gifts of "aqua vitae", a form of whisky. In January 1570, she wrote that Lochleven Loch was frozen, and her son was in the "Loich", the old castle on the lake island, because he was keeping the Earl of Northumberland, who was a fugitive from the Northern Rebellion. In June 1571, she wrote of her health and complained that Agnes, her daughter-in-law had not visited;"Ye sall onderstand that I have beyne wery extreme seik baith in my bodye and stomak, and with ane sair leg, quhairoff (I) am nocht throichlie conwelleseit as yett ... I wald skarslie have belevit ye would have bene neir (at) hand and veseit me nocht, and frindis heir."

Family
Margaret Erskine's children with Sir Robert Douglas included:
 William Douglas, 6th Earl of Morton
 Robert Douglas, who married Christina Stewart, 4th Countess of Buchan and was the father of James Douglas, 5th Earl of Buchan.
 Margaret Douglas
 Euphemia Douglas, who married Patrick Lindsay, 6th Lord Lindsay.
 Janet Douglas, who married Sir James Colville of Easter Wemyss (d. 1562).
 Catherine Douglas, who married David Durie.

Footnotes

External links
article on Erskine family tree

Mistresses of James V of Scotland
1572 deaths
Year of birth unknown
16th-century Scottish women
1515 births
Daughters of barons